Statistics of the Primera Fuerza for the 1917–18 season.

Overview
It was contested by 6 teams, and Pachuca won the championship.

League standings

Top goalscorers
Players sorted first by goals scored, then by last name.

References
Mexico - List of final tables (RSSSF)

1917-18
Mex
1917–18 in Mexican football